A general election was held in the United Kingdom between 24 November and 18 December 1885 and 70 constituency seats in Scotland were contested. One of the two university seats for Scotland was also contested. Scotland had gained 12 seats since the previous election as a result of the Redistribution of Seats Act 1885, and the electorate had increased from 293,581 to 560,580 as a result of the Representation of the People Act 1884 (out of 24,397,385 people registered in the 1881 census).

Of particular note was the splintering of the Liberal representation in Scotland. Some 7 MPs were returned as Independent Liberals, with Edinburgh in particular seeing 3 of its 4 constituencies return Independent Liberals.

In the western Highlands the Crofters Party emerged as the dominant force, taking four constituencies. The Independent Liberal MP elected for the Wick Burghs also aligned with the group. The emergence of the group was owed to the Representation of the People Act 1884, which had reduced the property qualifications for voters. As a result many Crofters were able to vote for the first time in 1885. The Crofting Party worked in close collaboration with the Highland Land League, and opposed the lack of secure and tenure and the severely reduced access to land for crofters.

Results
Below is a table summarising the results of the 1885 general election in Scotland.

University constituencies

Votes summary

See also

References

1885 in Scotland
1880s elections in Scotland
1885
Scotland